The name Froggy 101 may represent any of these stations that carry the Froggy branding:

 WGGY 101.3 FM, Scranton, Pennsylvania
 WFGE 101.1 FM, State College, Pennsylvania